Arthropeina is a fly genus in the family Xylomyidae, the "wood soldier flies".

Species
 A. colombiana Fachin & Amorim, 2014
 A. diadelothorax Fachin & Amorim, 2014
 A. fulva Lindner, 1949
 A. lindneri Fachin & Amorim, 2014
 A. melanochroma Fachin & Amorim, 2014
 A. pseudofulva Fachin & Amorim, 2014

References

External links
 

Xylomyidae
Brachycera genera
Taxa named by Erwin Lindner
Diptera of South America